Eduardo Estívariz Ruiz de Eguilaz (born 27 May 1966), known as Estíbariz, is a Spanish retired footballer who played as a right back.

He made 244 professional appearances over the course of 13 seasons, mainly for Athletic Bilbao.

Club career
Born in Vitoria-Gasteiz, Álava, Estíbariz started his professional career with Deportivo Alavés (having spent his second year in the fourth division) and Sestao Sport Club (second level), signing with Basque giants Athletic Bilbao late into the 1989 January transfer window. Although never an undisputed first-choice during his spell at the San Mamés Stadium (his best output consisted of 21 La Liga games in two different seasons), he was regularly used.

Aged 31, Estíbariz moved to Rayo Vallecano where he played three seasons, achieving top-flight promotion in his second after appearing in 35 matches. He closed out his career after a sole campaign with CD Aurrerá de Vitoria, also in his native region.

Estíbariz returned to Athletic Bilbao five years after his departure, starting out as trainer for the youth sides – until 2009, he would work in that capacity with farm team CD Basconia and the reserve squad. In June 2010 he returned to the youth academy, after being named director of methodology.

References

External links

1966 births
Living people
Footballers from Vitoria-Gasteiz
Spanish footballers
Association football defenders
La Liga players
Segunda División players
Segunda División B players
Tercera División players
Deportivo Alavés players
Sestao Sport Club footballers
Athletic Bilbao footballers
Rayo Vallecano players
Basque Country international footballers
Athletic Bilbao non-playing staff
CD Aurrerá de Vitoria footballers